The Method may refer to:

Science 
 The Method of Mechanical Theorems, a work of Archimedes
 Discourse on the Method, a work of Descartes

Arts and entertainment 
 The Method (TV series), a 2015 Russian television drama series
 The Method (album), a 1997 album by Killing Time 	 
 The Method (film), a 2005 film by Marcelo Piñeyro
 The Method (novel), a 2009 novel by Juli Zeh
 Andwella or The Method, a band of UK/Irish origin
 "The Method", a song by We Are Scientists from Safety, Fun, and Learning (In That Order)
 Method acting
 Stanislavski's system

See also
 Method (disambiguation)